Oran Henry Pape (March 10, 1904 – April 30, 1936) was a member of the Iowa State Patrol in the United States. He is the first member of the Patrol to have been murdered in the line of duty. Prior to joining the Patrol, Pape played professional American football.

Football career
Pape played high school football at Dubuque Senior High School, where he was part of the 1924 state championship football team. He then played college football at the University of Iowa. Following college, he played in the National Football League for the Green Bay Packers, the Minneapolis Red Jackets, the Providence Steam Roller, the Boston Braves, and the Staten Island Stapletons. Pape was a member of the 1930 Green Bay Packers NFL Championship team. Pape left the NFL in 1934, and returned to Iowa.

Police career and death
Pape attended the State Police Academy at Camp Dodge. He was appointed to the newly formed Iowa Highway Patrol (later Iowa State Patrol) in August 1935, one of the first men to become an officer in the Patrol. On April 28, 1936, Pape was patrolling U.S. Highway 61 near Muscatine, Iowa.  He noticed a car that had been reported stolen. After pulling the car over, Pape approached the car. The driver, Roscoe Barton, pointed his gun at Pape and ordered him into his car. Barton drove away with Pape as his hostage. A short while later, Pape saw an opportunity to overpower Barton, and the two began struggling. During the struggle, Barton was shot in the head, and Pape was shot in the abdomen.

Both men were taken to Hershey Hospital in Muscatine. Barton died from his injuries soon after arriving at the hospital. Pape was treated for his gunshot wound, however his condition eventually took a turn for the worse. Doctors were unable to transfuse blood into him because of his collapsed veins. Pape died at 2:40pm on April 30. He was buried at Linwood Cemetery in Dubuque. His badge number 40 was retired from service.

Legacy
Pape's murder is one of the main reasons the Patrol began the practice of "cross drawing" guns. In this practice, officers wear their guns opposite their strong arm. In theory, an officer would be able to hold on to a person with their strong arm and be able to draw their weapon at the same time. This practice is no longer used, with troopers now carrying their sidearms on their strong side.  The I-80 bridges over the Cedar River in Cedar County, Iowa are named in his honor (Trooper Oran Pape Memorial Bridge).

References

External links
Biography of Oran Pape
Iowa State Troopers Association, Website

1904 births
1936 deaths
American football running backs
American police officers killed in the line of duty
American state police officers
Boston Braves (NFL) players
Deaths by firearm in Iowa
Green Bay Packers players
Iowa Hawkeyes football players
Male murder victims
Minneapolis Red Jackets players
People from Dickinson County, Iowa
People murdered in Iowa
Players of American football from Iowa
Providence Steam Roller players
Staten Island Stapletons players